NDC80 homolog, kinetochore complex component pseudogene is a protein that in humans is encoded by the 2700099C18Rik gene.

References 

Genes on human chromosome 17
Mouse genes
Human proteins